Tina Hergold (born 18 October 1981) is a Slovenian retired tennis player.

In her career, she won three singles titles and nine doubles titles on the ITF Circuit. On 4 December 2000, she reached her best singles ranking of world No. 157. On 20 November 2000, she peaked at No. 143 in the doubles rankings.

Playing for Slovenia at the Fed Cup, Hergold has a win–loss record of 2–2.

ITF Circuit finals

Singles: 6 (3 titles, 3 runner-ups)

Doubles: 14 (9 titles, 5 runner-ups)

References

External links
 
 
 

1981 births
Living people
Slovenian female tennis players